Tiene (Tiini), or Tende, is a Bantu language of the Democratic Republic of Congo.

References

Teke languages
Languages of the Democratic Republic of the Congo